Santa Clara do Sul is a municipality in the state of Rio Grande do Sul, Brazil. By 2020 its population was 6,681.

See also
List of municipalities in Rio Grande do Sul

References

Municipalities in Rio Grande do Sul